30 is an album by American singer Harry Connick Jr. The album was recorded in 1998, when Connick was 30 years old, but it was not released until 4 years later, on the same date as his album Songs I Heard. The album includes both vocal and instrumental tracks.

Track listing

Personnel
Harry Connick Jr. – piano, vocals, arranger, liner notes
Ben Wolfe – bass on track #5 "If I Were a Bell"
Rev. James Moore – organ, vocals on track #8 "There Is Always One More Time"
Wynton Marsalis – trumpet on track #14 "I'll Only Miss Her When I Think of Her"
Tracey Freeman – Producer
Vladimir Meller – Mastering
Steven Kadison – Assistant mastering engineer
Gregg Rubin – Recording & Mix Engineer
Ryan Hewitt – Assistant engineer
Christopher Austopchuk – Art direction
Alice Butts – Art direction
Palma Kolansky – Photography

Charts

References

2001 albums
Columbia Records albums
Harry Connick Jr. albums